A rejection hotline is a phone number which delivers a pre-recorded message telling the caller that the caller is rejected by the person who gave the caller that number. This project  was set up as a practical joke by a Jeff Goldblatt From Atlanta in 2001.

Goldblatt says that after observing an awkward situation where a man approached a pretty woman and failed to get her phone number, he came up with the idea of a fake phone number as a subtle way of rejecting the date. While the hotline was set up as a joke, in 2002 a business, RH Brands, LLC was started based on the website humorhotlines.com. Soon the hotline started receiving millions  of calls. Since then a number rejection hotlines were set up the United States, Ireland, Australia and Canada. In some major cities the number receives over 50,000 calls a day without any paid promotion whatsoever. humorhotlines.com facilitated numerous pranks across the country by setting numerous hotlines such as  It Could Always Suck More Hotline, the Psychiatric Hotline, and the Angry Santa Hotline, which had been also receiving millions of calls. Most of them had nothing to do with "rejection".

The classic rejection hotline says: "Hello, this is not the person you are trying to call. The person who gave you this number obviously did not want you to have their real number", and proceeded to list a variety of possible reasons for the rejection: "Maybe you're just not this person’s type … This could mean short, fat, ugly, dumb, annoying, arrogant or just a general loser", etc.

There are several other numbers with various kinds of messages.

While the hotlines were supposed to be a joke, their popularity shows they do fulfill a social function.

The idea of a rejection hotline was the core of a Purim prank pulled by The Jerusalem Post in 2021.

References

Dating
Telecommunication services
Bilateral relations
Practical jokes